Epicure was an Australian progressive rock band formed in Ballarat, in 1996 as Pima's Little Finger. Their original line-up was Juan Alban on vocals and guitar, Tim Bignell on bass guitar, Michael Brown on guitar, Luke Cairnes on guitar and Dom Santamaria on drums. "Armies Against Me" and "Life Sentence", were picked up by national youth radio, Triple J. These appeared on The Goodbye Girl (March 2004), their third album. Both tracks were listed on the Triple J Hottest 100, 2003, whilst the title track of their next extended play, Self Destruct in Five (October 2004), made the Triple J Hottest 100, 2004.

In late 2003 they supported United States rock group, Live, on their Australian tour. They played at the Big Day Out festival in January 2004 and at both Falls Festivals in December. The group disbanded in mid-2010 after a final tour, Quietly into the Night.

History

Epicure started in 1996 as a school rock band, Pima's Little Finger, its five original members Juan Alban, Michael 'Brownie' Brown, Tim Bignell, Dom Santamaria and Luke Cairnes played their first gig at the Dunnstown Football Club and were booed off stage in favour of Cold Chisel. They released their first recording in 1996 – a demo tape, The Least of These. Their base in Ballarat's local live music scene was The Rat at the Bridge Mall Inn (now closed). After they released their first extended play, The Means to an End (1997), they were signed to Flugelhorn Records and managed by Mark Eatock, who bought the Bridge Mall Inn in early 1999. Triple J radio helped bring Epicure to the Australian consciousness when they added "Feet from Under Me" and "Johnny Venus" to their play lists in 2000. Both appeared on their debut album, Fold (August 2000).

Shortly after the release of their second EP, Elevator (October 2001), Brown and Cairnes both left and were replaced by Dan Houlihan on lead guitar and Dean Shannon on keyboard. This brought a new feeling to the band, and Shannon became popular with the crowds for his showmanship. In the same month they issued their second album, Airmail, which is a compilation of their previous EPs. Their third EP, Life Sentence, was independently released with distribution by MGM on 1 September 2003. It peaked at No. 77 on the ARIA Singles Chart. It was recorded by Cam MacKenzie, with tracks mixed by producer, Chris Dickie.

During that year both "Armies Against Me" and "Life Sentence", were picked up by Triple J. These appeared on their third album, The Goodbye Girl (March 2004), which peaked at No. 88 on the ARIA Albums Chart. The band spent 2003–04 touring Australia, particularly in regional areas. They supported shows by Pete Murray, the Beautiful Girls, Xavier Rudd, the Whitlams, and Monique Brumby. A dispute between the band and Shannon occurred in mid-2004, which resulted in his replacement on keyboards by Heath McCurdy. Their third full-length album, Main Street, was released in October 2005, and provided the single, "Tightrope Walker".

In late 2006 Houlihan was replaced by Mick Hubbard (ex-Jen Cloher) on lead guitar. During June–July 2007 the band took a break from recording their next album, Postcards from a Ghost, and played support slots for Mia Dyson on the east coast of Australia. Epicure posted a video of recording sessions on Myspace and asked fans to choose between "Landslide" and "Cobra Kisses" for the album's lead single – "Cobra Kisses" was chosen and issued. Postcards from a Ghost followed in October 2008 via Down in Flames/MGM. For the album aside from the band members they used session musicians: Chris Brodieon pedal steel; Jason Bunn on viola; Dani Fry on backing vocals; Sianne Lee on backing vocals; Caewen Martin on cello; Jodi Moore on electric violin; Stu Syme on tambourine; Jenny Thomas on violin; and Erki Veltheim on viola. In February 2010 the band announced their final tour, Quietly into the Night before disbanding in May.

Afterwards 

Juan Alban issued his debut solo extended play, Too Long in Flight, in March 2011.

Members

Juan Alban (Vocals/Guitar) 1996 - 2010
Tim Bignell (Bass) 1996 - 2010
Dom Santamaria (Drums) 1996 - 2010
Michael Brown (Guitar / Misc Sounds) 1996 - 2001
Luke Cairnes (Guitar) 1996 - 2001
Dean Shannon (Keyboard) 2002 - 2004
Dan Houlihan (Guitar) 2002 - 2005
Heath McCurdy (Keyboard) 2004 - 2009
Mick Hubbard (Lead Guitar) 2005 - 2009
Josh Murphy (Lead Guitar) 2009 - 2010

Discography

Studio albums

Compilations

Extended plays

References

External links
Epicure - Official site
Australian Music Online - Artist Profile

Australian alternative rock groups
Victoria (Australia) musical groups